Holender is a surname. Notable people with the surname include:

Filip Holender (born 1994), Hungarian footballer
Ioan Holender (born 1935), Romanian-born Austrian opera administrator

See also
Holdener